Hezekiah C. Tilton was a member of the Wisconsin State Assembly.

Biography
Tilton was born on August 30, 1818. He became a Methodist clergyman. During the American Civil War, he served for a time as Chaplain of the 13th Wisconsin Volunteer Infantry Regiment of the Union Army. Tilton died on March 26, 1879.

Political career
Tilton was a member of the Assembly in 1864. In 1875, he was nominated by the Prohibition Party for Governor of Wisconsin, but declined. Later, he was appointed to the State Board of Charities and Reform.

References

Members of the Wisconsin State Assembly
American Methodist clergy
19th-century Methodist ministers
Methodist chaplains
Religious leaders from Wisconsin
Union Army chaplains
Union Army officers
People of Wisconsin in the American Civil War
1818 births
1879 deaths
Burials in Wisconsin
19th-century American politicians
19th-century American clergy